During the 1981–82 English football season, Leicester City F.C. competed in the Football League Second Division.

Season summary
In the 1981–82 season where the Football League decided to increase the points total on a win to three instead of two points, Leicester's start was inconsistent but during the last couple of months of the campaign, the Foxes revived strongly and finished in eighth. At the end of the season, Wallace left to join Motherwell.

Final league table

Results
Leicester City's score comes first

Legend

Football League Second Division

FA Cup

League Cup

Squad

References

Leicester City F.C. seasons
Leicester City